Le Fanu is a surname, also spelled LeFanu. Notable people with the name include

Alicia Le Fanu (born 1791), Irish poet and writer
Alicia Sheridan Le Fanu (1753–1817), Irish writer
Henry Le Fanu (1870–1946), Anglican bishop in Australia
James Le Fanu (born 1950), British physician, medical journalist and author
Michael Le Fanu (1913– 1970), British Royal Navy officer, Admiral of the Fleet
Nicola LeFanu (born 1947), British composer
Sarah LeFanu (born 1953), Scottish academic and author
Sheridan Le Fanu (1814–1873), Irish writer of Gothic tales and mystery novels
Thomas Le Fanu (priest) (1784–1845), Irish Dean
Thomas Le Fanu (civil servant) (1858-1945), Irish civil servant
Victor Le Fanu (1865–1939), Irish rugby union player
William LeFanu (1904–1995), Irish librarian